The Toronto subway is a rapid transit system serving Toronto and the neighbouring city of Vaughan in Ontario, Canada, operated by the Toronto Transit Commission (TTC). It is a multimodal rail network consisting of three heavy-capacity rail lines operating predominantly underground, and one elevated medium-capacity rail line.  three new lines are under construction, two light rail lines and one light metro line.

In 1954, the TTC opened Canada's first underground rail line, then known as the "Yonge subway", under Yonge Street between Union Station and Eglinton Avenue with 12 stations.

Overview

There are four operating rapid transit lines in Toronto:

 Line 1 Yonge–University is the longest and busiest rapid transit line in the system. The modern line is U-shaped, having two northern terminalsat Vaughan Metropolitan Centre and Finchand its southern end at Union station in downtown Toronto.
 Line 2 Bloor–Danforth, opened in 1966, runs parallel to Bloor Street and Danforth Avenue between Kipling station in Etobicoke and Kennedy station in Scarborough. Construction has started on a three-stop extension of Line 2 northeastward from Kennedy station to Sheppard Avenue and McCowan via Scarborough City Centre.
 Line 3 Scarborough, originally known as the Scarborough RT, is an elevated medium-capacity (light metro) rail line serving the city's eponymous suburban district. It opened in 1985, running from Kennedy station to McCowan station via . It is the only rapid transit line in Toronto to use Intermediate Capacity Transit System (ICTS) technology. Because of maintenance difficulties, Line 3 will be demolished and replaced by buses in 2023 until the extension of Line 2 to Scarborough City Centre opens in 2030.

 three new lines are under construction, two light rail lines and one light metro line.
 Line 5 Eglinton (also known as the Eglinton Crosstown LRT) is an under-construction  light rail line along Eglinton Avenue, planned to run from Kennedy station in the east to Mount Dennis station in the west. The line is scheduled to open in 2023 at a cost of approximately $12billion. The line will have 25 stations, 15 of which will be underground, while the remaining ten will be at-grade stops located in at the road's median. Construction began in 2011.
The extension will have 7 stations, 4 of which will be underground and 2 of which will be elevated. Construction began in 2022, and is scheduled for completion in the 2030s.
 Line 6 Finch West (also known as the Finch West LRT) is an under-construction , 18-stop light rail line travelling from Finch West station on Line 1 Yonge–University to the North Campus of Humber College, located mainly in the median of Finch Avenue. It is scheduled for completion in 2023, with an estimated cost of $1.2billion. Construction on Line 6 began in 2019.
 Ontario Line is an under-construction  light metro line from Exhibition station to Science Centre station, providing a second rapid transit line through the Financial District and downtown core. The project evolved from the long-planned Downtown Relief Line, first proposed in the mid-1980s. The line is scheduled for completion in 2031 at a cost of $17 to $19 billion. Upon opening, the plan is to reassign the "Line 3" moniker currently used by Line 3 Scarborough to the Ontario Line.

History

Timeline of openings

Line 1 Yonge–University

The line ran under or parallel to Yonge Street between Eglinton Avenue and Union station. It replaced the Yonge streetcar line, Canada's first streetcar line. In 1963, the line was extended northwards from Union station under University Avenue to Bloor Street, where it would later connect with the Bloor–Danforth subway (opened in 1966) at the double-deck St. George station. In 1974, the Yonge Street portion of the line was extended from Eglinton station north to Finch station. The Spadina segment of the line was constructed north from St. George station initially to Wilson station in 1978, and in 1996 to Downsview station, renamed Sheppard West in 2017. Part of the Spadina segment runs in the median of Allen Road – an expressway formerly known as the Spadina Expressway – and crosses over Highway 401 on overpasses. Six decades of extensions gave the line a U-shaped route running from its two northern terminals (Finch and Vaughan Metropolitan Centre stations) and looping on its southern end at Union station.

Line 2 Bloor–Danforth

 
Opened in 1966, the Bloor–Danforth subway runs east–west under or near Bloor Street and Danforth Avenue. It replaced the Bloor streetcar line (which also served Danforth Avenue). Initially, the subway line ran between Keele station and Woodbine station. In 1968, the line was extended west to Islington station and east to Warden station, and in 1980, it was further extended west to Kipling station and east to Kennedy station.

Line 3 Scarborough

Opened in 1985, the Scarborough RT (today's Line 3) is a light metro line running from Kennedy station to McCowan station. The TTC started to construct the line to use Canadian Light Rail Vehicles. However, the TTC was forced to convert to the Intermediate Capacity Transit System technology because the provincial government threatened to cut funding to the organization if it did not. This line was never extended, and the current plan is to close and dismantle the line, replacing it with an extension of Line 2 to Scarborough Town Centre and beyond.

Line 4 Sheppard

Opened in 2002, the Sheppard subway runs under Sheppard Avenue from Sheppard–Yonge station to Don Mills station. The line was under construction when a change in provincial government threatened to terminate the project, but Mel Lastman, the last mayor of the former City of North York (today part of Toronto), used his influence to save the project. Despite the construction of many high-rise residential buildings along the line since its opening, ridership remains low resulting in a subsidy of $10 per ride. The line was intended to be extended to Scarborough Centre station, but because of the low ridership and the cost of tunnelling, there was a plan to extend rapid transit eastwards from Don Mills station via a surface light rail line, the Sheppard East LRT. However, in April 2019, Premier Doug Ford announced that the provincial government would extend Line 4 Sheppard to McCowan Road at some unspecified time in the future, thus replacing the proposed Sheppard East LRT.

Line 5 Eglinton

Metrolinx is funding the  Line 5 Eglinton, a light rail line along Eglinton Avenue. From Mount Dennis in the west to Brentcliffe Road (east of Laird Drive), the line will run almost entirely underground where Eglinton Avenue is generally four to five lanes wide. From east of Brentcliffe Road to Kennedy station, the line will operate on the surface in a reserved median in the middle of Eglinton Avenue, where the street is at least six lanes wide. Building on the surface instead of tunnelling reduces the cost of construction on the eastern end of the line. The Eglinton line originated from Transit City, a plan sponsored by then–Toronto mayor David Miller, to expedite transit improvement by building several light rail lines through the lower density parts of the city. Of the light rail lines proposed, only the Eglinton and Finch West lines are under construction . Line 5 is estimated to be completed in 2023.

Line 6 Finch West 

Line 6 Finch West, also known as the "Finch West LRT", is an under-construction line being built by Mosaic Transit Group along Finch Avenue. It is to be operated by the Toronto Transit Commission and was also part of the Transit City proposal announced on March 16, 2007. The , 18-stop line is to extend from Finch West station on Line 1 Yonge–University to the north campus of Humber College. The line is forecast to carry about 14.6million rides a year or 40,000 a day by 2031. It is scheduled for completion in 2023, with an estimated cost of $1.2billion. Construction on this line began in 2019.

Ontario Line 

Ontario Line is an under-construction  light metro line from Exhibition station to Science Centre station, providing a second rapid transit line through the Financial District and downtown core. Although a subway line along Queen Street was first proposed in the early 1900s, the Downtown Relief Line was first proposed in the mid 1980s. The Ontario Line project extends further west and north than previous proposals to serve more of the city. The line is scheduled for completion in 2031 at a cost of $17 to $19 billion. Upon opening, the plan is for the line is take the "Line 3" moniker currently used by Line 3 Scarborough.

Major incidents

On March 27, 1963, there was an electrical short in a subway car's motor. The driver decided to continue operating the train, despite visible smoke in the affected car, until the train reached Union station. This decision resulted in the destruction of six subway cars and extensive damage to the tunnel and signal lines west of Union station. Following this incident, safety procedures involving electrical malfunctions and/or fire in subway trains, were revised to improve safety and reduce the likelihood of a similar incident occurring.

On October 14, 1976, arson caused the destruction of four subway cars and damage to Christie station, resulting in the closure of part of the Bloor–Danforth line for three days, and the bypassing of Christie station for some time afterwards for repairs.

On August 11, 1995, the TTC suffered the deadliest subway accident in Canadian history, known as the Russell Hill accident, on the Yonge–University line south of St. Clair West station. Halfway between St. Clair West and Dupont stations, a southbound Line 1 subway train hit the rear of a stationary train ahead of it. Three people died and 100 other people were injured, some of them seriously. This led to a major reorganization at the TTC, with more focus on maintaining a "state of good repair" (i.e., an increased emphasis on safety and maintenance of existing TTC capital/services) and less on expansion.

Operations and procedures

Terminal station reversals and short turns
 The heavy-rail subway lines were built in multiple segments with multiple crossovers. These are typically used for reversals at terminal stations, and allow arriving and departing trains to cross to and from the station's farside platform. They are also used for short turning trains at some through stations in order to accommodate emergency and planned service suspensions. Planned service suspensions generally occur on weekends for planned maintenance activities that are impractical to perform overnight. There is only one regular short turn service that occurs during the morning rush hour on Line 1 Yonge–University when some northbound trains short turn at Glencairn station.

On Line 3 Scarborough, light metro trains cannot switch directions except at the ends of the line as there are no intermediate crossovers between the two termini. Thus, there can be no short turns on Line 3.

Door operation
The heavy-rail subway lines use either a one- or two-person crew. With two-person train operation, an on-board train guard at the rear of the train is responsible for opening and closing the subway car doors and making sure no one is trapped in a door as the train leaves a station. From the subway's inception in 1954 to 1991, the train guard notified patrons that the subway car doors were closing with two short blasts from a whistle. With one-person train operation (OPTO), one person operates the train as well as the doors. The TTC notes that modern technology now allows one person to safely operate the train and close the doors, and that OPTO is in use in many major cities with large subway systems such as the London Underground, the Paris Metro, the Chicago "L" and the Montreal Metro. 

Initially, all the heavy-rail subway lines (1, 2 and 4) used two-person train operation. On October 9, 2016, Line 4 Sheppard was converted to OPTO. On August 1, 2021, the TTC tested OPTO on a portion of Line 1 on Sundays only. Effective November 21, 2021, the TTC introduced OPTO seven days per week on Line 1 between Vaughan Metropolitan Centre and St. George stations. Between St. George and Finch stations, the TTC continued using two-person train operation until the full conversion of the line to OPTO on November 20, 2022. Since opening in 1985, trains on Line 3 has been operated by one person.

According to a 2020 survey conducted by the Amalgamated Transit Union Local 113, two-thirds of Torontonians surveyed opposed the TTC's plan to eliminate the train guard on Line 1, and three-quarters of Torontonians disapproved of the fact that the public was not consulted when train guards were removed from Line 4's daily operations in 2016, citing safety concerns, among other issues, as key reasons motivating their response.

In 1991, as a result of lawsuits, electronic chimes, in the form of a descending arpeggiated major triad and a flashing pair of orange lights above the doorway, added for the hearing impaired, were tested and gradually introduced system-wide during the 1990s. The Toronto Rocket trains use the same door chimes and flashing orange lights as the older trains do, and also plays the additional voice announcement, "Please stand clear of the doors". Those chimes have become synonymous with the TTC and Toronto in general to the point that the CBC Radio One local afternoon show, Here and Now, includes them in its theme music.

Entering a station 
There are several basic procedures that need to be completed once a train has entered a station. On TTC's Line 2, several symbols of different colours are installed on the station wall for the crew to use as a reference in positioning the train in the platform. A red circle, located at the train exit end of the platform, should be directly in front of the train operator's cab window when the train is aligned properly. A green triangle, located at the opposite end of the platform, is provided as a reference to the train guard that shows that the train is correctly aligned. Before opening the train doors, the guard lowers the cab window and points their finger out the window toward the green triangle when the cab is lined up with the triangle. If the train is not lined up properly, the guard is not permitted to open the doors.

To operate the doors, the guard is first required to insert and turn a key. This action provides system control to the door control panel. The doors are then opened by pushing buttons. After the doors are opened, the guard is required to stick their head out the cab window to observe passengers boarding and exiting. The train doors remain open for at least 15 seconds.

When the guard determines that boarding is complete, the doors are closed. Electronic chimes and flashing lights are turned on, then the automated announcement "please stand clear of the doors" is played over the train's public address system, and finally the doors are closed. The chimes provide a clear notification and warning to passengers that the doors are closing and are played before the automated announcement is played, because such announcements may not be heard when the station is crowded.

After the doors are closed, the guard provides a signal to the train operator that the train can proceed. The signal is in the form of a green light that turns on inside the operating cab. When the doors are closed, a light turns on in the operating cab. The guard is instructed to visually observe the platform while the train departs the station. The distance for this visual inspection is typically three car lengths. An orange triangle installed on the station wall indicates the location where the guard may stop observing the platform and pull their head back into the cab. This is done to ensure that no passengers are being dragged along by the train.

Platform markers
All staffed subway operations must verify that the train is properly berthed before the doors are opened. At each subway platform, a set of three  platform markers are affixed onto the platform wall. The train operator and guard use them to position the train.

The current platform markers used for Lines 1, 2, and 4 are as follows:
 Circular red disk (Lines 1, 2, and 4)—This marker is typically mounted on the station platform wall to assist the train operator in positioning the train in the station. When the operator's window is aligned with the red disk, the train is properly berthed in the station.
 Green triangle (Lines 1 and 2)—This marker is typically mounted on the station platform wall to indicate to the guard, who is positioned in the trailing car, that it is safe to open the doors. When the guard's window is aligned with this marker, the guard must confirm the stop position by physically pointing to the green triangle. If the guard cannot see the green triangle, they are not permitted to open the train doors.
 Orange triangle (Lines 1 and 2)—This marker is typically mounted on the station platform wall to assist the guard, who is positioned in the trailing car, to observe the platform for the required distance as the train is moving to exit the station. When the guard sees this triangle, they can cease observations. The distance between the green and orange triangles is typically the length of three rail cars.

Prior to 2017, when subway guards operated the doors from the fifth car instead of the trailing car in the T1 trains on Line 2, different platform markers were used. The following markers have now fallen into disuse as a result of a March 2017 policy change that required all guards to work from the trailing car on Line 2:

 Circular green disk (Line 2)—This marker was mounted on the station platform wall in front of the guard's window in the fifth car from the lead unit. It indicated to the guard that the train was properly berthed. The guard was required to point to the circle before opening the doors to confirm the stop position.
 Circular orange disk (Line 2)—This marker was mounted on the station platform wall to indicate to the guard when they could cease train departure platform observations. At this point, the guard closed the cab window.

Service frequency

During rush hour, up to 65 trains are on Line 1 simultaneously, 45 trains on Line 2, 5 trains on Line 3, and 4 trains on Line 4. During non-rush hour periods, there are 30–46 trains on Line 1 at any one time.

On weekdays and Saturday, subway service runs from approximately 6:00am to 1:30am; Sunday service begins at 8:00am. Start times on holidays may vary.

Station announcements

On January 8, 1995, train operators began to announce each stop over the train's speaker system as a result of pressure from advocacy groups for the visually impaired, but announcements were sporadic until the TTC began to enforce the policy circa 2005. Later, automated announcements were implemented under further pressure from the advocacy groups. All Toronto subway trains use an automated system to announce each station which is played twice over the speaker system: when the train departs a station (e.g. "The next station is: Dufferin, Dufferin station") and when it arrives at the following station (e.g. "Arriving at: Dufferin, Dufferin station"). In addition, the TTC's new Toronto Rocket subway trains provide visible and audible automatic stop announcements. Unlike the other trains, the Toronto Rocket trains also announce connections to other TTC subway lines, such as "Change for Line 2", and terminus stations, "This is a terminal station" where applicable. , they also announce, except at terminus stations, which side the train doors will open on at each stop based on the direction of train travel.

Winter operations
Switches and power rails are vulnerable to malfunction under extreme winter conditions such as heavy snow or freezing rain. During such events, the TTC runs "storm trains" overnight along subway lines to keep power rails clear of ice. The TTC also has trains to apply an anti-freeze to the power rail once freezing rain starts.

These precautions were also used on Line 3 Scarborough, which uses two power rails. After reviewing operations during the winter of 2018–2019, the TTC decided to change its procedures for Line 3. Thus, about two hours before an expected storm, the TTC may decide to shut down Line 3 and replace it with bus service. Just before the storm of February 2, 2022, the TTC replaced all Line 3 trains with 25 buses.

To keep switches in the yards from freezing, crews use switch heaters and manually monitor them to ensure they stay in working order during winter storms. Workcars are run as storm trains within the yards to prevent ice from building up on the power rails. The TTC stores subway trains in tunnels along main lines rather than in exterior yards.

Stations

The Toronto subway has 75 stations divided into four lines. Most stations are named for the nearest major arterial road crossed by the line in question. A few are named for major landmarks, such as shopping centres or transportation hubs, served by the station. The stations along the University Avenue section of the Yonge–University line, in particular, are named entirely for landmarks and public institutions (and ) and major churches ( and ). All trains, except for short turns, stop at every station along their route and run the entire length of their line from terminus to terminus. Nearly all stations outside the central business district have terminals for local TTC bus routes and streetcar routes situated within their fare-paid areas. (All regular TTC bus and streetcar routes permit free transfers both to and from connecting subway lines.)

By December 23, 2016, Presto card readers had been installed in at least one priority subway station entrance across the TTC network. Throughout 2017 and into mid-2018, the remaining subway station entrances that still use legacy turnstiles (which were retrofitted with Presto readers between 2010 and 2015) and the "floor-to-ceiling" revolving turnstiles (found in automatic/secondary entrances, which do not have Presto readers on them) were replaced by the new Presto-equipped "glass-paddle" fare gates.

Accessibility

A growing number of Toronto's subway stations are accessible to wheelchair users in general and riders with accessibility issues. Upgrade plans to stations call for all stations to be barrier-free and have elevator access by 2025. Sheppard West station was the first station to be fully accessible when it opened in 1996.

Cleanliness

The May 2010 TTC cleanliness audit of subway stations found that none of them meets the transit agency's highest standard for cleanliness and general state of repair. Only 21 stations scored in the 70- to 80-percent range in the TTC's cleanliness scale, a range described as "Ordinary Tidiness", while 45 fell in the 60- to 70-percent range achieving what the commission describes as "Casual Inattentiveness". The May audit was the third in a series of comprehensive assessments that began in 2009. The commission announced a "Cleaning Blitz" that would add 30 new temporary cleaners for the latter part of 2010 to address major issues and has other action plans that include more full-time cleaners, and new and more effective ways at addressing station cleanliness.

Design and public art

According to a 1991 CBC report, "aesthetics weren't really a priority" on Toronto's subway system, describing stations as "a series of bathrooms without plumbing". Since that time, Toronto's subway system has had over 40 pieces installed in various subway stations. More art appeared as new stations were built and older ones were renovated. 

In 2004, USA Today said of the Sheppard subway line: "Despite the remarkable engineering feats of this metro, known as Sheppard Subway, [it is] the art covering walls, ceilings, and platforms of all five stations that stands out. Each station is 'a total art experience where artists have created imaginative environments, uniquely expressing themes of community, location, and heritage' through panoramic landscapes and ceramic wall murals."

Internet and mobile phone access
The ad-supported service (branded as "TConnect") is provided by BAI Canada, who have agreed to pay $25million to the TTC over a 20-year period for the exclusive rights to provide the service. TTC/BAI Canada plan to offer TConnect at all underground stations. Commuters have to view a video advertisement to gain access to the Internet. It is expected that all of the 69 subway stations will have service by 2017, as well as the six stations along the Line 1 extension to Vaughan. From early December 2015 to late January 2016, users of TConnect were required to authenticate themselves using a Twitter account, whose Canadian operations sponsored the TConnect Wi-Fi network. Users of the network can sign in to enable an automatic Wi-Fi connection for 30 days. This arrangement was resumed on an optional basis from July 2016 to late November/early December 2016.

, the Wi-Fi network is available at all existing stations, including the  stations, and will be available in all future stations.

On June 17, 2015, the TTC announced that Wind Mobile (later rebranded Freedom Mobile) customers could access cellular connectivity at some TTC subway stations. BAI Canada has built a shared Wi-Fi and cellular infrastructure for the TTC that allows any wireless carrier to sign on and provide underground cellular service to their customers. Wind, as the launch carrier, had a one-year period of exclusivity, which expired in June 2016. Since July 1, 2016, the shared cellular DAS had been open for other carriers to join. By October 2020, none of the other carriers had yet joined. Cellular services are available at 28 stations with service at additional stations having been added in December 2016, including the Toronto–York Spadina Subway Extension stations since December 2017. The tunnels from Vaughan Metropolitan Centre station to Sheppard West station and from St. George station to Bloor–Yonge station on both Line 1 and Line 2 also have cellular service.

Naming

The TTC considers multiple different factors when they name stations and stops for subway and LRT stations. They consider local landmarks, the cross streets of the station, distinct communities of the past and present in the vicinity of the station, names of other stations in the system, and the grade of the station.

Metrolinx uses five criteria for naming stations and stops. These are:
 Simplicity
 Names must be logical and relevant to the area the station is built in
 Names should be relevant for the life of the station
 Names should help passengers locate themselves within the region
 Uniqueness

Metrolinx also uses the word "stop" in place of "station" at 10 of the 25 stations along the first phase of Line 5, particularly those that are not grade-separated.

Rolling stock

The following table shows the vehicle type by line:

Heavy rail stock

Line 1 Yonge–University and Line 4 Sheppard operate using the newest version of Toronto's subway cars, the Toronto Rocket, while Line 2 Bloor–Danforth uses the older T1 subway trains.

The TTC's original G-series cars were manufactured by the Gloucester Railway Carriage and Wagon Company. All subsequent heavy-rail subway cars were manufactured by Bombardier Transportation or one of its predecessors (Montreal Locomotive Works, Hawker Siddeley, and UTDC). All cars starting with the Hawker Siddeley H series in 1965 have been built in Bombardier's Thunder Bay, Ontario, plant. The final H4 subway cars were retired on January 27, 2012. This was followed by the retirement of the H5 subway cars, which had their final in-service trip on June 14, 2013, and the H6 retirement, which followed one year later with a final run on June 20, 2014.

Following the introduction of the Toronto Rocket trains on Lines 1 and 4, all the T1 trains were moved to Line 2. The T1s were expected to last until 2026. By the end of 2019, the TTC had proposed an overhaul to extend the T1 fleet's life by 10 years at an estimated cost of $100 million. By mid-2020, the TTC had started the design phase for a new generation of subway trains to replace the T1 fleet on Line 2 Bloor–Danforth. In late 2021, the TTC expected that the new trains would be introduced between 2026 and 2030, at an estimated cost of $1.6 billion. On October 13, 2022, the TTC issued a request for proposals to construct 480 new subway cars (80 six-car train sets) of a design different from the T1 and Toronto Rocket fleet for delivery between 2027 and 2033. , the TTC plans to overhaul the T1 fleet if newer trains cannot be delivered in time.

Light metro stock

Line 3 Scarborough uses 28 S-series trains built by the Urban Transportation Development Corporation (UTDC) in Millhaven, Ontario. These Intermediate Capacity Transit System (ICTS) trains are Mark I models, similar in design to the original trains found on the Vancouver SkyTrain and the Detroit People Mover. These are the original vehicles of the line and have been in service since the line's opening in 1985. Because of the trains' age, they have been refurbished for operation and initially intended to last until the extension of Line 2 Bloor–Danforth is built. In February 2021, the TTC announced plans to accelerate the retirement of Line 3 in 2023. This was due to delays in planning and construction of the subway extension (which was then projected to open in 2030 at the earliest) along with the increasing difficulty of performing critical maintenance work on the trains.

Light rail stock

Metrolinx plans to use 76 Bombardier Flexity Freedom low-floor, light-rail vehicles for Line 5 Eglinton; however, 44 Alstom Citadis Spirit vehicles may be used if Bombardier is unable to deliver the Flexity Freedom on time. Such a substitution would require modifications to Line 5, especially the maintenance facility, as the Citadis Spirit is longer than the Flexity Freedom. Metrolinx intends to use 17 Citadis Spirit vehicles on Line 6 Finch West instead of the Flexity Freedom.

Technology

The heavy rail and light metro lines have some characteristics in common: Such lines are fully isolated from road traffic and pedestrians; the station platforms are covered, and the trains are boarded through many doors from high platforms within a fare-paid zone separated by faregates.

In contrast, the surface portions of the light rail lines (Lines 5 and 6) will fit into the street environment. Light-rail tracks will be laid on the surface within reserved lanes in the middle of the street, and cross street intersections at grade. Surface stations will have simple, low-level platforms. However, like heavy rail and light metro, passengers will be able to board and alight the light rail trains by multiple doors.

The light metro on Line 3 uses a more complex technology than heavy rail, which a TTC document describes as follows:
Track is the 5 rail system on direct fixation and car is powered by an induction or "reaction rail" situated between the running rails at the same top of rail elevation. There are two side contacting power rails +300V and −300V respectively situated a distance of about 14 in. from the closest gauge line of one running rail.

Signals

Heavy rail

Fixed-block signalling was originally used on the Toronto subway since the opening of Toronto's first subway in 1954 and was the first signalling system used on Lines 2 and 4. As of 2022, Lines 2 and 4 use fixed-block signalling but Line 1 no longer does. Fixed-block signalling uses automatic signalling to prevent rear-end train collisions, while interlocking signals are used to prevent collisions from conflicting movements on track crossovers.

, automatic train control (ATC) has been implemented along the entire length of Line 1. In 2009, the TTC awarded a contract to Alstom to upgrade the signalling system of the existing section of Line 1, as well as equip its extension into Vaughan, with moving block–based communications-based train control (CBTC) by 2012. The estimated cost to implement ATC on Line 1 was $562million, $424million of which was funded by Metrolinx. The first section of the "Urbalis 400" ATC system on Line 1 entered revenue service on December 17, 2017, between Sheppard West and Vaughan stations, in conjunction with the opening of the Toronto–York Spadina subway extension (TYSSE) project.

The benefits of ATC on Line 1 are:
 a reduced headway between trains from 2.5 minutes to 2 minutes during rush hours, allowing a 25 percent increase in the number of trains that can operate
 fewer signal-related delays relative to the old fixed-block system
 more efficient use of electricity, thus reducing operational costs
 allowing single-track, bidirectional operation for trains in passenger service, albeit with reduced frequency, to allow for off-hour maintenance of the opposite track

The TTC has plans to convert Line 2 to ATC by 2030, subject to the availability of funding.

Light metro
Line 3 Scarborough has been equipped with automatic train control from the outset, using the same SelTrac IS system as Vancouver's SkyTrain, meaning it could be operated autonomously. However, the TTC opts to equip each S-series train with an operator on board for door monitoring.

The future Ontario Line will use automatic train control with driverless trains. Its stations will be equipped with platform screen doors.

Light rail
When completed, Line 5 Eglinton will use Bombardier Transportation's Cityflo 650 CBTC automatic train control on the underground section of the line between Laird station and Mount Dennis station, along with the Eglinton Maintenance and Storage Facility (under construction since 2019) adjacent to Mount Dennis station.

Track

According to rail historians John F. Bromley and Jack May, the reason that the Yonge subway was built to the streetcar gauge was that between 1954 and 1965, subway bogies were maintained at the Hillcrest Complex, where the streetcar gauge was used for shop tracks. The Davisville Carhouse was not equipped to perform such heavy maintenance, and the bogies would be loaded onto a specially built track trailer for shipment between Davisville and Hillcrest. This practice ceased with the opening of the shops at the Greenwood Yard in 1965.

Line 3 Scarborough uses standard-gauge tracks, as the ICTS design for the line did not allow for the interchange of rail equipment between the subway system and Line 3. When its ICTS vehicles need anything more than basic service (which can be carried out at the McCowan Yard), they are carried by truck to the Greenwood Subway Yard.

The Line 5 Eglinton and Line 6 Finch West LRT lines will be constructed with standard-gauge tracks. The projects are receiving a large part of their funding from the Ontario provincial transit authority Metrolinx and, to ensure a better price for purchasing vehicles, it wanted to have a degree of commonality with other similar projects within Ontario.

Facilities
The subway system has the following yards to provide storage, maintenance and cleaning for rolling stock. All yards are located above ground.

In the second quarter of 2018, the City of Toronto moved to expropriate Canadian Pacific Railway's disused Obico Yard at 30 Newbridge Road / 36 North Queen Street in Etobicoke for use as a potential future yard at the western end of Line 2 Bloor–Danforth. The yard is situated immediately to the southwest of Kipling station, the western terminus of Line 2.

Safety

There are several safety systems for use by passengers in emergencies:

 Emergency alarms (formerly "Passenger assistance alarms"): Located throughout all subway trainsWhen the yellow strip is pressed, an audible alarm is activated within the car, a notification is sent to the train crew and the Transit Control Centre, which in turn dispatches a tiered response. An orange light is activated on the outside of the car with the alarm for emergency personnel to see where the problem is.
 Emergency power cut devices: Marked by a blue light, located at both ends of each subway platformFor use to cut DC traction power in the event a person falls or is observed at track level or any emergency where train movement into the station would be dangerous. These devices cut power in both directions for approximately one station each way.
 Emergency stopping mechanisms (PGEV: passenger/guard emergency valve): Located at each end of each subway car (with exception of the Toronto Rocket trains)Will activate the emergency brakes of the vehicle stopping it in its current location (for use in extreme emergencies, such as persons trapped in doors as train departs station, doors opening in the tunnel, derailments etc.)
 Passenger intercoms: Located on subway platforms and near/in elevators in stationsFor use to inform station collector of security/life safety issues
 Automated external defibrillators (AEDs): Located in several subway stations near collector boothsFor use in the event someone suffers cardiac arrest
 Public telephones: Located in various locations in all stations, and at the Designated Waiting Area's on each subway platform. Emergency calls can be made to 911 toll free. Phones located at the DWAs also include a "Crisis Link" button that connect callers, free of charge, to a 24-hour crisis line in the event that they are contemplating self-harm.

Stations with high platforms have a crawl space under the platform edge which the TTC recommends that a person who has fallen onto the track use to avoid an oncoming train. Lying flat between the two rails is not recommended due to shallow clearances. The platform edge has a yellow strip behind which passengers should wait to avoid a fall.

Stations do not have platform screen doors, a feature which for Lines 1, 2 and 4 would require station modification, automatic train control (ATC) and a $1.35-billion investment which is not funded . ATC is needed to stop trains at a precise position along the platform to line up train doors with platform doors. , ATC has been activated along the entire length of Line 1; thus, it would be possible to install platform screen doors along Line 1. The future Ontario Line will be built to operate with ATC and will feature platform doors from its opening. The benefits of platform doors would be:
 Blocking those attempting suicide or trespassers from the tracks: it takes 70 to 90 minutes to resume operations each time there is a personal injury at track level
 Eliminating fires from debris falling on the tracks and the third rail
 Allowing trains to enter crowded stations at speed, thus speeding up service along the line

The light-rail Line 5 Eglinton will use a guideway intrusion detection system (GIDS) to detect trespassers on the tracks on the underground sections of the line. When GIDS detects a trespasser on the tracks, it will issue an audio warning to the trespasser, provide live CCTV video to central control, and automatically stop the train without driver intervention. Each station will be equipped with multiple GIDS scanners along the station platform. There will also be GIDS scanners at each tunnel portal. In addition, there will be scanners within the yellow tactile strips along the platform edge to issue an audio warning if a person steps on it before the train has arrived.

A trial program began in 2008 with Toronto EMS and has been expanded and made permanent, with paramedics on hand at several stations during peak hours: Spadina and Bloor–Yonge (morning peak: 7am–10am) and Union and Eglinton (evening peak: 2pm–6pm).

Training
Subway operators begin their training at Hillcrest with a virtual reality mockup of a Toronto Rocket car. The simulator consists of the operator cab with full functions, a door and partial interior of a subway car. The simulator is housed in a simulated subway tunnel. Construction of a new subway training centre is underway at the Wilson Complex, as part of the Toronto Rocket subway car program.

Expansion plans

Provincially supported projects

On April 10, 2019, Ontario premier Doug Ford announced rapid transit–related projects that the Province of Ontario would support with either committed or future financing. One such project is the Ontario Line, a proposed  rapid transit line that has succeeded the Relief Line proposal. Initially, the project was projected to be completed in 2027, but this was later pushed back to 2030. A groundbreaking ceremony for the Ontario Line was held on March 27, 2022.

The Line 5 West Extension to Pearson Airport is a proposal to extend Line 5 Eglinton from its terminus at Mount Dennis station west along Eglinton Avenue West to the proposed Pearson Transit Hub in Mississauga. In April 2019, Ford said that he would commit funds for this proposal.

The Yonge North Subway Extension (YNSE) is a proposal to extend Line 1 Yonge–University north along Yonge Street from Finch station, the existing terminus of Line 1, to near Highway 7 in Richmond Hill. There would be new stations at Steeles Avenue, Clark Avenue, between Highway 7 and Highway 407 near Langstaff GO Station and Richmond Hill Centre Terminal (dubbed "Bridge station"), and High Tech Road. The extension was proposed in the province's 2007 MoveOntario 2020 plan. A major problem with this proposal is that Line 1 is at capacity, and the TTC has said that the Relief Line and SmartTrack must both be in service before opening the YNSE. The project is projected to be completed by 2030.

The Scarborough Subway Extension (SSE) is a proposal to replace Line 3 Scarborough with an eastward extension of Line 2 Bloor–Danforth. On October 8, 2013, Toronto City Council conducted a debate on whether to replace Line 3 with a light rail line or a subway extension. In 2014, the city council voted to extend Line 2 to Scarborough City Centre, which would result in the closure of Line 3. TTC and city staff finalized the precise route of the SSE in early 2017. In 2019, the Government of Ontario proposed a modified version of the proposal now known as the Line 2 East Extension (L2EE). The proposed completion deadline for the project is between 2029 and 2030.

The Line 4 East Extension to McCowan is a proposal to extend Line 4 Sheppard east along Sheppard Avenue East to McCowan Road, where it will connect with the Scarborough Subway Extension. Doug Ford said in April 2019 that he would commit funds related to this proposal.

Other proposals

The Line 5 East Extension to Malvern is a proposal to extend Line 5 Eglinton east to Malvern. This proposal was originally part of the cancelled Scarborough–Malvern LRT in Transit City. It would have stations at Eglinton GO and Guildwood GO, as well as the University of Toronto Scarborough campus.

The Jane LRT is a proposed LRT line that would begin at Jane station on Line 2 and proceed north to Pioneer Village station on Line 1. While initially part of the cancelled Transit City plan, the Jane LRT is part of the 2018–2022 TTC Corporate Plan and tentatively referred to as Line 8.

The Line 4 West Extension to Sheppard West station is a proposal that would extend Line 4 Sheppard west along Sheppard Avenue West to Sheppard West station, where it would link to Line 1 Yonge–University. It is currently listed as an "unfunded future rapid transportation project" in the City of Toronto's 2013 Feeling Congested? report.

The Line 6 East Extension to Finch station is a proposal that would extend Line 6 Finch West east along Finch Avenue West to Finch station, where it would link up with Line 1 Yonge–University. In March 2010, the Ontario government eliminated the proposed section of line between Finch West station and Finch station because of budget constraints. This section of the line was part of the original Transit City proposal. In 2013, this plan was revived as an "unfunded future rapid transit project" in the City of Toronto's Feeling Congested? report, meaning this extension may be constructed sometime in the future. The extension was later shown in the 2018–2022 TTC Corporate Plan with no timeline for completion.

Along with a proposal to extend Line 6 to Finch station, there was another proposal that would have extended the line farther to Don Mills station, where it would have provided a connection to Line 4 Sheppard. In May 2009, Metrolinx proposed that the line be extended from Finch station along Finch Avenue East and Don Mills Road into Don Mills station to connect with the Sheppard East LRT and create a seamless crosstown LRT line in northern Toronto to parallel the Eglinton Crosstown LRT (later designated Line 5 Eglinton) in central Toronto. The TTC said that a planning study would have commenced in 2010.

The Line 6 West Extension to Pearson Airport is a proposal that would extend Line 6 Finch West west to Pearson Airport, where it would provide a link to Line 5 Eglinton. In 2009, the TTC studied the feasibility of potential routings for a future westward extension of the Etobicoke–Finch West LRT to the vicinity of the Woodbine Live development, Woodbine Centre, and Pearson International Airport. This extension was later reclassified as a future transit project as described in the 2013 Feeling Congested? report by the City of Toronto. Metrolinx revealed in January 2020 that they would study a possible connection to the Pearson Transit Hub at Pearson Airport.

Abandoned plans
The Queen subway line was a subway line first proposed in 1911. When Line 1 was first built, a roughed-in station was included under Queen station, with the intention that the Queen subway would be the city's second subway line. The route of the Queen subway line is included in the routes for both the Relief Line and the Ontario Line proposals.

The Eglinton West line was a proposed subway line in the late 1980s on which construction began in the early 1990s. It was cancelled after the election of Mike Harris as premier of Ontario. Much of its planned route is included in Line 5 Eglinton.

One proposed expansion of Line 2 Bloor–Danforth into Mississauga included eight potential stations stretching west from Kipling station to Mississauga City Centre, retrofitting some existing GO Transit stations. The plan was for the subway stations to open in 2011. Mississauga mayor Hazel McCallion and the Regional Municipality of Peel did not support the project.

The Relief Line was a proposed heavy-rail subway line running from Pape station south to Queen Street East and then west to the vicinity of Toronto City Hall. The proposal included intermediate stations at Sherbourne Street, Sumach Street, Broadview Avenue, and another near Gerrard Square. In January 2016, alignment options and possible stations were still being studied, and the project was unfunded. Construction was expected to take about ten years to complete. As early as 2008, Metrolinx chair Rob MacIsaac expressed the intent to construct the Relief Line to prevent overcrowding along Line 1. Toronto City Council also expressed support for this plan. In April 2019, the Government of Ontario under Doug Ford announced that the Ontario Line would be built instead of the Relief Line. As a result, TTC and City of Toronto staff suspended further planning work on the Relief Line in June 2019.

Transit City
The Sheppard East LRT was a proposed light rail line running east from Don Mills station to Morningside Avenue in Scarborough. Construction of the Sheppard East LRT was to start upon completion of Line 6 Finch West. However, in July 2016, the Toronto Star reported the Sheppard LRT had been deferred indefinitely. In April 2019, Premier Doug Ford announced that the provincial government would extend Line 4 Sheppard to McCowan Road at some unspecified time in the future, replacing the proposed Sheppard East LRT.

The Don Mills LRT was a proposed LRT line that would have headed north from Pape station along Don Mills to Don Mills station. Its route was later incorporated into the Relief Line and Ontario Line proposals.

The Scarborough Malvern LRT was a proposed LRT line from Kennedy station east to the University of Toronto Scarborough. Its route was later incorporated into a proposed eastern expansion of Line 5 Eglinton.

See also

 List of metro systems
 Mind the gap
 Toronto Subway (typeface)
 Transportation in Toronto

References

Notes

Sources
 
 
 
 Welcome Aboard – Tomorrow's Transit Today – UTDC 1985

External links

 Official TTC site
 Webpage by subway line:
 Line 1 Yonge–University
 Line 2 Bloor–Danforth
 Line 3 Scarborough
 Line 4 Sheppard
 Line 5 Eglinton
 Line 6 Finch West
 Official TTC Subway Map
 News, history and discussion
 CBC Digital Archives: Going Underground: Toronto's Subway and Montreal's Metro
 The TTC's Official Subway Travel Time Chart (archived version using the way back machine)
 The TTC ride guide as searchable Google Map
 Vivanext Subways – Yonge extension projects
The Subway Comes to the Archives, online exhibit on Archives of Ontario website

 
4 ft 10⅞ in gauge railways
600 V DC railway electrification
Electric railways in Canada
Passenger rail transport in Toronto
Passenger railways in Ontario
Rail transport in the Greater Toronto Area
Railway lines opened in 1954
Underground rapid transit in Canada